Georgepeta is the major panchayath village in Thallarevu mandal in East Godavari district, Andhra Pradesh.

Villages in East Godavari district